The White God (German: Der weiße Gott) is a 1932 Danish-German adventure film directed by George Schnéevoigt and starring Paul Richter, Mona Mårtenson, and Rudolf Klein-Rogge. It premiered on 14 May 1932.

It is the German-language version of George Schnéevoigt's Danish–Norwegian film Eskimo (released 1930). There is also a French-language version.

Cast
 Paul Richter as Jack Norton 
 Mona Mårtenson as Ekalonk 
 Rudolf Klein-Rogge as Mariak 
 Ada Kramm as Anny 
 Henki Kolstad as the cabin boy
 Knut Christian Langaard as the captain 
 Paul Rehkopf   
 Josef Dischner

References

Bibliography
 Grange, William. Cultural Chronicle of the Weimar Republic. Scarecrow Press, 2008.

External links

1932 films
1932 adventure films
Danish adventure films
German adventure films
Films of the Weimar Republic
1930s German-language films
Films directed by George Schnéevoigt
German multilingual films
Films set in the Arctic
Seafaring films
Danish multilingual films
German black-and-white films
Danish black-and-white films
1932 multilingual films
Norwegian adventure films
1930s German films